Osbornebreen is a glacier in Oscar II Land at Spitsbergen, Svalbard, Norway. It has a length of 21 kilometers, merges with the glaciers Devikbreen, Klampebreen and Vintervegen, and debouches into St. Jonsfjorden. The mountain ridge Goldschmidtfjella forms a six kilometer long nunatak in the glacier.

References

Glaciers of Spitsbergen